Kim Adler is an American Ten-pin bowling professional who was a member of the Professional Women's Bowling Association (PWBA). The right-hander is considered one of the top female bowling players of all time, competing professionally from 1991–2003 and collecting 16 national PWBA titles, including major tournament wins at the 1996 Hammer LPBT Players Championship, 1997 Sam's Town Invitational and the 1999 U.S. Women's Open. In addition to her PWBA accomplishments, Adler placed first in Classic All-Events at the 2004 USBC Women's Open Championships.

Adler is a 2016 inductee into the USBC Hall of Fame, and a 2022 inductee into the PWBA Hall of Fame.

Adler was born September 1967 in Springfield, Massachusetts, and grew up in neighboring town, East Longmeadow. She moved to Florida in 1992. She retired from the PWBA in 2003, after the organization folded. She returned to college in 2004, first becoming an Emergency Medical Technician-Paramedic, then a Registered Nurse, then finally a certified Nurse Practitioner. She obtained her Master's degree in Nursing as a hospitalist nurse practitioner from the University of South Florida in 2011. She now lives in Viera, Florida with her family where she works full time.

Bowling career
Adler made her PWBA debut in 1991 at age 23. She started slowly, making only two cash cuts that season, and another two cuts in 1992. In 1993, her career took off. She made fifteen Top 10 finishes that season, won her first PWBA title at the Alexandria Open in Alexandria, Louisiana, and finished runner-up for PWBA Player of the Year. She won a second title in 1994 at the AMF Ninja Challenge in Corpus Christi, Texas.

1995 was Adler's first PWBA season with multiple titles, as she won the Storm Doubles-Sam's Town with partner Nancy Fehr, then won a singles title at the Hammer Eastern Open. She won two titles in each of the next five seasons (1996 through 2000), including major championships at the Hammer Players Championship (1996), Sam's Town Invitational (1997) and Women's U.S. Open (1999).

After a down year in 2001, she rebounded with one title in 2002, and her 16th and final PWBA title in 2003.

Bowling Statistics, Titles, Accomplishments 
 PWBA Professional Women's' Bowling Association Hall of Fame member, Superior Performance (2022)
 USBC Hall of Fame member, Superior Performance (2016)
 16 National PWBA Titles (three majors)
 2004 USBC Women's National All Events Champion
 26 career 300 games
 High Series: 823
 Five time All-American Team, including 2000 Team Captain
 Bowlers Journal Bowler of the Decade (1990s) Nominee
 2000 Metropolitan Bowling Writers Bowler of the Year
 1999 Southern Bowling Writers Bowler of the Year
 1999 U.S. Women's Open champion
 1997 Sam's Town Invitational champion
 1996 Hammer LPBT Players Championship champion
 1993 PWBA Player of the Year, runner-up
 1991 PWBA Rookie of the Year
 5th woman in bowling history to roll back-to-back 300 games
 1st 800 series by a woman on the newly developed Sport Pattern by USA Bowling, 2001
 Ranked in the Worldwide Top 10 for ten seasons
 Career PWBA Average: 210.51
 Career TV Average: 212.82
 Career PWBA TV Appearances: 57 (1st=16, 2nd=11, 3rd=8, 4th=11, 5th=11).
 Career PWBA earnings: $822,743 (9th all-time).

Additional Information

 Adler was the first professional bowler to command outside-the-bowling-industry sponsorships by signing deals with Kiwi Computers, Pacific Pools and Clabber Girl Women's Sports Team. She was the first professional athlete to use eBay to successfully auction advertising space on herself. In her career, she was also sponsored by Brunswick Bowling, Splitsville Lanes, AMF Bowling, Pro Sports Systems, Kegel Training Center, and Moro Designs/Pro Release.
 She has worked as an analyst for a number of women's professional bowling telecasts on CBS Sports Network and ESPN/ESPN2..
 She was a staff writer for Bowling Digest magazine. She was awarded the 2003 Herta Kissel Bowling Writer of the Year.
 She was featured in various articles and interviews over the years in publications such as USA Today, New York Times Magazine, SPORT magazine, Sports Illustrated for Women, Light and Tasty, Chiropractic Today, Bowlers Journal, Florida Today, Chicago Tribune, Off the Lanes, Parade Magazine, MSNBC, Bob & Tom Show, Monsters of the MidDay, and Murray in the Morning.
 She was also a USBC Silver-certified bowling instructor, working with Professional Bowling Camps, Professional Bowling Instruction, Kegel Training Center, and Adler Training Institute.

12/31/15: Official Press Release from USBC on www.bowl.com

ARLINGTON, Texas – Kim Adler of Melbourne, Florida, and Mike Durbin of Hollywood, California, have been elected to the United States Bowling Congress Hall of Fame in the Superior Performance category. The two were among eight bowlers (six men and two women) on the national ballot elected to the 2016 USBC Hall of Fame class by a USBC panel of veteran bowling writers, hall of famers and board members.

The 2016 USBC Hall of Fame induction ceremony will take place April 28 in Las Vegas as part of the USBC Convention. Adler and Durbin, along with three inductees elected in November by the USBC Hall of Fame Committee, will comprise the 2016 USBC Hall of Fame class. Adler, 48, is a 16-time Professional Women’s Bowling Association winner. Her victories came between 1993 and 2003, and her last three titles were at the St. Clair Classic in Fairview Heights, Illinois, in 2000, 2002 and 2003. She was the runner-up for PWBA Player of the Year in 1993 and earned her lone major victory at the U.S. Women’s Open in 1999 [per rules in place at the time]. She also owns four PWBA regional titles. Adler’s success extended to the biggest stage in women’s bowling, the USBC Women’s Championships, where she won Classic All-Events in 2004. She has 11 additional top-10 finishes at the Women’s Championships, including a second-place finish in Classic Singles in 2004 and a runner-up effort at the 2002 USBC Queens.

References

External links
 Official Website

American ten-pin bowling players
Living people
Year of birth missing (living people)
University of South Florida alumni
People from East Longmeadow, Massachusetts